Phyllonorycter estrela is a moth of the family Gracillariidae. It is known from Spain and Portugal.

The larvae feed on Genista cinerea. They probably mine the leaves of their host plant.

References

estrela
Moths of Europe
Moths described in 2006